Is Life Worth Living? is a 1921 American silent drama film directed by Alan Crosland and starring Eugene O'Brien, Winifred Westover and Arthur Housman.

Cast
 Eugene O'Brien as Melville Marley 
 Winifred Westover as Lois Mason 
 Arthur Housman as Jimmy Colton 
 George Lessey as Lawyer 
 Warren Cook as Joseph Gordon 
 Arthur Donaldson as Isaac - Pawnbroker 
 Florida Kingsley as Mrs. Grant

References

Bibliography
 Monaco, James. The Encyclopedia of Film. Perigee Books, 1991.

External links

1921 films
1921 drama films
Silent American drama films
Films directed by Alan Crosland
American silent feature films
American black-and-white films
Selznick Pictures films
1920s American films